Benzingerode has been a village incorporated into the borough of Wernigerode since 1 April 1993. in the district of Harz in the German state of Saxony-Anhalt.

Location 
Benzingerode lies in the North Harz about 7 kilometres east of Wernigerode, on the old B 6 federal road that runs through the middle of the village and branches off to Silstedt at the eastern exit. Southwest of Benzingerode liest the Stapenberg. A low ridge, the Ziegenberge runs eastwards towards Heimburg on which is the site of an old hillfort, the Struvenburg.

References

External links 
 Benzingerode in 40 photos (dual: German/French)

Former municipalities in Saxony-Anhalt
Wernigerode
Duchy of Brunswick